Karolina Stallwood is a former Controller of More4 and E4.

Career
In 2005 she was part of the team that started More4. She later became a scheduler for E4 and More4.

Controller
In April 2012 she became Controller of More4 and E4.

TV4
In May 2014 she joined the Swedish TV4 channel as Controller of TV4 Film, TV4 Guld and TV4 Komedi.

References

British television executives
Women television executives
British women business executives
Channel 4 people
TV4 AB
Living people
Year of birth missing (living people)